Wilson Edgar Terry was the last Kentucky veteran of the Spanish–American War. He was born March 7, 1874, in Crockettsville, Breathitt County, Kentucky, to his father Isaac Terry. He attended Lees College in Jackson. His first wife was Ida Kidd, who died when their first child, a daughter, was an infant.  He then married Ruse Wilder and had seven children with her, among them the writer Berniece T. Hiser. He lived at Cow Creek, Kentucky, until 1927, when he moved to Kings Mills, Ohio, where he ran a general store. He was a staunch Republican all his life. He was also a notary public and licensed to preach by the Baptists. Governor Bert T. Combs appointed him a Kentucky colonel. He died February 15, 1968, at age 93 and was buried in the Rose Hill Cemetery in Mason, Ohio.

1874 births
1968 deaths
People from Breathitt County, Kentucky
People of the Spanish–American War
United States Army soldiers
People from Warren County, Ohio
Baptists from Kentucky